Pasqua is a surname meaning "Easter" in Italian.

Notable people with the name include:

Alan Pasqua (born 1952), American jazz pianist and composer
Charles Pasqua (1927–2015), French businessman and Gaullist politician
Dan Pasqua (born 1961), American baseball player
Giuseppina Pasqua (1855–1930), Italian opera singer
Joe Pasqua (1918–1998), American football player
Michael Di Pasqua (born 1953), American percussionist
Simone Pasqua (1492–1565), Italian Roman Catholic bishop and cardinal
Ugolino Vivaldi Pasqua (1885–1910), Italian aviation pioneer       
 Iruth Pasqua Alegria born in philiines 1992, work for TSL in UAE, she is a strange mix between human, cat and a fox